Dlouhá Loučka is a municipality and village in Olomouc District in the Olomouc Region of the Czech Republic. It has about 2,000 inhabitants.

Administrative parts
Villages of Křivá and Plinkout are administrative parts of Dlouhá Loučka.

Notable people
Lev Skrbenský z Hříště (1863–1938), Cardinal of the Catholic Church; died here

References

Villages in Olomouc District